Juan Alonso Pimentel de Herrera (Villalón, baut. 29 June 1553 - Madrid, 7 November 1621) was a Knight of the Order of Santiago, Grandee of Spain, 5th Duke of Benavente at the death without issue of the 4th Duke, as he was the second son of the 3rd Duke, 8th Count of Mayorga, 3rd Count of Villalón, President of the Council of Italy, 15th Viceroy of Valencia, 25th Viceroy of Naples. 

In 1569 he married Catalina de Quiñones Vigil de Quiñones (died 1574), 6th Countess of Luna. In 1582 he married his cousin Mencía de Zúñiga y Requeséns, daughter of Luis de Requesens y Zúñiga, Governor of the Duchy of Milan 1572–1573, Governor of the Spanish Netherlands (1573–1576).

References

External links
 Xenealoxiasdoortegal.net

 Books.google.es

1621 deaths
Viceroys of Naples
Viceroys of Valencia
Dukes of Benavente
Grandees of Spain
Counts of Spain
Knights of Santiago
Year of birth unknown